Radio opera (German: 'Funkoper' or 'Radiooper') is a genre of opera.  It refers to operas which were specifically composed to be performed on the radio and is not to be confused with broadcasts of operas which were originally written for the stage.  Radio operas were generally shorter than staged operas and some occupied less than fifteen minutes.  Plots were usually more straightforward than those of stage operas.

The earliest radio operas were broadcast in the 1920s and followed earlier broadcasts of plays with incidental music.  The first radio opera seems to have been The Red Pen, composed by Geoffrey Toye to a libretto by A. P. Herbert. It was originally aired by the  British Broadcasting Corporation on March 24, 1925. Germany followed with Gustav Kneip's Christmas opera for children, Christkinds Erdenreise (The Christ-child's journey on Earth), 24 December 1929, and Walter Goehr's Malpopita in May 1931.

The 1930s proved to be the high-point of radio opera, with at least twelve productions composed by German, American, Czech, Swiss and French composers.  The genre declined after World War II, perhaps with the advent of television, although composers such as Dallapiccola, Pizzetti, Rota, Henze, Zimmermann, Maderna and Rasmussen continued to compose for the radio, as do 21st-century composers such as the Estonian Jüri Reinvere, Amy Kohn in America and Robert Saxton in Britain.

See also
List of radio operas
List of television operas

Notes

References
Sadie, Stanley: The New Grove Dictionary of Opera, (London, 1992) 

Opera terminology
 
Opera genres